The 1963 Dutch Grand Prix was a Formula One motor race held at Zandvoort on June 23, 1963. It was race 3 of 10 in both the 1963 World Championship of Drivers and the 1963 International Cup for Formula One Manufacturers. The 80-lap race was won by Lotus driver Jim Clarkby a margin of more than a full lapafter he started from pole position. Dan Gurney finished second for the Brabham team and Ferrari driver John Surtees came in third.

Classification

Qualifying 

 Notes

 †  – Ireland posted a faster time (1:33.3) in a Lotus-BRM car, but he surrendered the car during the final qualifying session to Jim Hall, whose entry had not been accepted initially by the organizers.

Race

Championship standings after the race

Drivers' Championship standings

Constructors' Championship standings

 Notes: Only the top five positions are included for both sets of standings.

References

Dutch Grand Prix
Dutch Grand Prix
Grand Prix
Articles containing video clips
Dutch Grand Prix